Reinhart Koselleck (23 April 1923 – 3 February 2006) was a German historian. He is widely considered to be one of the most important historians of the 20th century. He occupied a distinctive position within history, working outside of any pre-established 'school', while making pioneering contributions to conceptual history (Begriffsgeschichte), the epistemology of history, linguistics, the foundations of an anthropology of history and social history, and the history of law and government.

Biography
Koselleck volunteered to serve as a German soldier during World War II, having previously joined the Hitler Youth, the youth organisation of the German Nazi Party. In May 1945 he was captured by the Red Army and was sent for debris removal to the Auschwitz concentration camp, before being transported to Kazakhstan and held there as a prisoner of war for 15 months until he was returned to Germany on medical grounds. He claimed that his personal experiences during the war were formative for his later academic direction, especially his interests in "crisis" and "conflict" and his skeptical stance towards "ideological" notions of moral or rational universalism and historical progress. He also claimed that the experience of being part of a defeated nation or culture enabled a more self-reflexive form of historical understanding, and that the most interesting perspectives on history are often written by the vanquished rather than the victors.

He became known for his doctoral thesis Critique and Crisis (1954), which was strongly influenced by the thought of Carl Schmitt; his habilitation thesis on "Prussia between Reform and Revolution", dealing with Prussia and Germany in the 18th and 19th centuries. Between 1972 and 1997 Koselleck co-edited, together with Werner Conze and Otto Brunner, the eight-volume encyclopedia Geschichtliche Grundbegriffe (Basic Concepts in History: A Historical Dictionary of Political and Social Language in Germany.")  This work, together with his later contributions, became the corner-stone of conceptual history, the study of the changing semantics and pragmatics of concepts in their social and political contexts.  Among his main contributions to Historiography are his reflections on time and temporality in history and the history of language, most famously the leading hypothesis of the Geschichtliche Grundbegriffe about a saddle time, or threshold time ("Sattelzeit") between 1750 and 1850, during which language (in Germany) changed into the language of modernity.

Later in life, Koselleck became interested in the study of war memorials and published articles on the topic. He participated in public debates during the 1990s about the construction of the Holocaust Memorial in Berlin, arguing that as a nation Germany had a "special responsibility" to continue acknowledge and remember the Holocaust, but that the memorial itself should remember all of the Holocaust's victims and not focus exclusively on a narrowly Jewish narrative.

Critique and Crisis
In his dissertation and 1959 book, Koselleck argues that contemporary understandings of politics have become dangerously depoliticized by Enlightenment utopianism: A reaction against Absolutism (the Hobbesian state) which was itself a reaction against the religious wars of the Reformation period in Europe. Koselleck closely follows Carl Schmitt's argument from The Leviathan in the State Theory of Thomas Hobbes by arguing that the absolutist state had made morality a matter of strictly private and individual judgement, disallowing moral conscience any role in political decision making. This overcame religious civil war and gave rise to the early modern, centralized state, which had a clear, narrow and authoritarian conception of politics as the monopolization of legitimate violence and the guaranteeing of obedience, security and order. 
Consequently, within the absolutist state the private realm grew in power, enabled by the degree of civil liberalism afforded by the regime toward private life. This private moral sphere was nurtured by the Enlightenment (especially, claims Koselleck, in the Republic of Letters and in "non-political" bourgeois secret societies such as the Illuminati and the Freemasons), consolidating itself around a self-conception as an emergent bourgeois "Society" during the 18th century. "Society" constituted a countervailing power which, by upholding the legitimacy of "critique" against existing political authoritarianism, eventually challenged the state, but in an apolitical, utopian way. "In the process," writes Victor Gourevitch in his foreword to Critique and Crisis, "existing political societies came to be judged by standards which take little or no account of the constraints which political men must inevitably take into account, standards which for all political intents and purposes are therefore Utopian." The problem is that the moralism and utopianism of modern ideologies is purely speculative and can offer no viable alternatives to prevailing institutions and practices. Hence, Enlightenment's anti-statism creates a "permanent crisis", a relapse into a kind of ideological civil war, which had culminated in enduring political instability and particularly in the 20th century phenomena of Soviet and Nazi totalitarianism and the ideological conflict of the Cold War. Koselleck argues that politics is better understood from the point of view of public servants, politicians, and statesman who are embedded within political institutions and immanently aware of their constraints and limitations, rather than from the supposedly disinterested perspective of philosophers and other social critics. His aim is to re-politicize contemporary discussions of politics and infuse them with a sense that conflict is an inevitable part of public life and an unavoidable factor in all political decision making, an argument reminiscent of Carl Schmitt, Koselleck's most important mentor.

Koselleck's portrayal of the Enlightenment public sphere in Critique and Crisis has often been criticized as reactionary and anti-modernist. His emphasis on the "secrecy" and "hypocrisy" of the 18th century German Enlightenment, and his preoccupation with Enlightenment as a source of conflict and crisis, has been read as an overly pessimistic account of the origins of modern world-views. It sits in stark contrast to the work of Jürgen Habermas, whose account of the 18th century Enlightenment holds it up as a model of democratic and deliberative politics. Moreover, his claim in the introduction of Critique and Crisis that the 20th century was gripped by a catastrophic "world crisis," has been criticized as being guilty of the same sort of secular eschatology he warns against within the text itself. In fact, for Koselleck modern philosophies were a form of secularized version of escathology: that is, theological prophecies of future salvation, an interpretation he adopted from Karl Löwith, his teacher at Heidelberg University. Others insist that the accusations against Koselleck of reactionary pessimism are overstated, and that he is rather attempting to engender a more reflexive and realistic use of political and social concepts.

See also 

History in the Plural. An Introduction to the Work of Reinhart Koselleck. Niklas Olsen, New York: Berghahn, 2012. 
"An Application of Conceptual History to Itself. From Method to Theory in Reinhart Koselleck's Begriffsgeschifte." Kari Palonen. Finnish Yearbook of Political Thought 1: 39-69 (1997).
"Crisis." Janet Roitman. Political Concepts, New School for Social Research.
 "Begriffsgeschichte’s History: Between Historicization of Concepts and Conceptual Politics." Interview with Falko Schmieder. Journal of the History of Ideas Blog (2019).

Works translated into English

Books
Critique and Crisis: Enlightenment and the Pathogenesis of Modern Society. Cambridge, Mass.: MIT Press, 1988.  | 
The Practice of Conceptual History: Timing History, Spacing Concepts. Series: Cultural Memory in the Present. Translated by Todd Samuel Presner. Stanford: Stanford University Press; 2002.  | 
Futures Past: On the Semantics of Historical Time. Series: Studies in Contemporary German Social Thought. Translated and with an introduction by Keith Tribe. New York, Columbia University Press; 2004.  | 
Sediments of Time: On Possible Histories. Series: Cultural Memory in the Present. Translated and edited by Sean Franzel and Stefan-Ludwig Hoffmann. Palo Alto, CA: Stanford University Press; 2018.  |

Articles
"Linguistic Change and the History of Events", Journal of Modern History 61(4): 649-666 (1989)
"Social History and Conceptual History", International Journal of Politics, Culture and Society 2(3): 308-325 (1989)
"Conceptual History, Memory and Identity", Contributions to the History of Concepts 2.1 (2006) A 2005 interview by Javier Fernandez-Sebastian.

References 

1923 births
2006 deaths
German male non-fiction writers
20th-century German historians
Nazi Party officials
Corresponding Fellows of the British Academy